Gongjing District is a district of the city of Zigong, Sichuan Province, China. According to the 2010 Census, Gongjing District has a population of 2,678,899 inhabitants.

References

Districts of Sichuan
Zigong